Novosibirsk Tolmachevo Airport  is situated in the town of Ob,  west of the center of Novosibirsk, an industrial and scientific center in Siberia and Russia's third-largest city.

Overview
There are two ( and ) active runways in Tolmachevo Airport, along with one large passenger terminal with two connected sections (Section A for domestic flights (18 check-in desks, 2 jet bridges, capacity 1,800 passengers/hour, and Section B for international flights (14 check-in desks, 3 jet bridges, capacity 1,300 passengers/hour), 2 cargo terminals and 61 aircraft stands. Runway 16 is equipped with an ILS CAT II, which enables aircraft operations in low ceiling (30 metres) and visibility (350 metres).

The airport is situated in the middle of the route from some important East-Asian cities (e.g. Seoul, Shanghai, Hong Kong, etc.) to Europe which makes it attractive for cargo airlines to use it for refueling stops. It serves also as a diversion airport on Polar route 1.
  
Tolmachevo is the busiest airport in Siberia and the sixth-busiest airport in Russia. It is also the busiest regional transit airport in Russia after Moscow MOW. In 2020, the airport served 4,634,166  passengers (-31.3%) and handled 34,158  tons of cargo (+0.05%). Detailed data for years 2003–2020 is in the Traffic Statistics section below.

The Tolmachevo Airport is operated by Novaport since 2011.

History
Operations began on July 12, 1957 with the first passenger flight of Tupolev Tu-104 from Novosibirsk to Moscow. The airport was owned by United Tolmachevo Aviation Enterprise and Ministry of Civil Aviation of the USSR until 1992. The airport then became a joint stock company in 1995, with 51% owned by the state.  The domestic terminal was completely renovated in 2006. Tolmachevo Airport is also the first Russian airport to receive ISO 9002-96 certificate. On November 29, 2012, for the first time in its history the airport received its three-millionth annual passenger. During 2014-2015 the former international terminal was enlarged and merged with the domestic terminal which doubled its passenger capacity. The airport celebrated its four-millionth annual passenger on December 21, 2016. In the last hours of 2017 another milestone was reached: on December 31, 2017 the airport handled its five-millionth annual passenger. On December 18, 2019 the airport celebrated its first 6.5-millionth annual passenger.

Plans for its further development include construction of a new rapid-exit taxiway and 4 stands for wide-body aircraft, On 15 September 2020 the airport commenced construction works of the new terminal. Work is being conducted by contractor Ant Yapı (Turkey). Construction of the 56,000 square meters terminal will be completed in 3Q2022. Phase two work will be completed by 2025.  The total area of the airport terminal will amount more than 100,000 square meters.

The airport is also home to the 337th Independent Helicopter Regiment (previously called the 562nd Air Base (Army Aviation)) flying Mil Mi-24P's and Mil Mi-8AMTSh-V's and the Composite Aviation Squadron, 32nd Independent Composite Transport Aviation Regiment, both as part of the 14th Air and Air Defence Forces Army.

Accidents and incidents

On 13 November 2020, an Antonov An-124 Ruslan aircraft operating Volga-Dnepr Airlines Flight 4066 suffered an uncontained engine failure on departure and was severely damaged. On landing back at Tolmachevo, the aircraft overran the runway and was further damaged when its nosewheels collapsed. All fourteen people on board survived.

Airlines and destinations

Passenger

Cargo

Statistics

(*)Preliminary Data. Source: Tolmachevo media centre

Ground transportation
Public transportation to the city is provided by a number of bus routes, as well as by private and municipal taxis. Shuttle bus service runs also between the airport and the Ob railway station at the Trans-Siberian Railway - a stop for Elektrichka local commuter trains and some long-distance trains in the direction of Omsk.

See also

 Novosibirsk Elitsovka Airport
 Novosibirsk Severny Airport
 List of the busiest airports in Russia
 List of the busiest airports in the former USSR

References

Other sources
 Novosibirsk Tolmachevo Airport at Russian Airports Database

External links

 Tolmachevo Airport Official website 
 
 
 Historical Weather Records for Novosibirsk

Airports built in the Soviet Union
Airports in Novosibirsk Oblast
Buildings and structures in Novosibirsk
Novaport
Airports established in 1957
1957 establishments in the Soviet Union
Russian Air Force bases
14th Air and Air Defence Forces Army